Duncan Alexander Croall Scott-Ford (4 September 1921 – 3 November 1942) was a British merchant seaman who was hanged for treachery after giving information to an enemy agent during the Second World War.

Early life
Scott-Ford was born in Plymouth, Devon, with the name Duncan Alexander Croall Smith, the son of Duncan Scott Smith who worked as a sick bed orderly in the Royal Navy. His father died on 23 March 1933 after catching pneumonia from the effects of taking an overdose of morphine in a suicide attempt, and Smith changed his surname to Scott-Ford in an attempt to improve his social status. He was educated at the Royal Hospital School, Holbrook from 1933 to 1937, and then on turning 16, enlisted in the Royal Navy and joined the shore establishment HMS Impregnable in Devonport in December 1937.

Service career

Royal Navy
In June 1939 Scott-Ford was serving on HMS Gloucester which had called at Dar-es-Salaam on a goodwill visit. He met and became infatuated by a German girl; the Security Service later came to believe that he may have told her secret naval codes. Later in 1940 his ship was stationed in Egypt and Scott-Ford became obsessed with a prostitute whom he often visited; he was discovered to have altered the book of his Post Office Savings account and sent to a court martial which convicted him. He was sentenced to two years' imprisonment and dismissed from the service with ignominy but, after a successful appeal by his mother, the sentence was remitted to six months' imprisonment and an honourable discharge.

Merchant Navy
Repatriated to Britain to serve his sentence, Scott-Ford was released in July 1941 and stayed briefly with his mother. They quarrelled over his mother's use of the allowance from his Royal Navy pay which he sent home, with Scott-Ford accusing his mother of using it to buy a fur coat. Shortly afterwards he joined the Merchant Navy. He was on board the SS Finland, which arrived in Lisbon on 10 May 1942.

Espionage
Soon after his arrival in Lisbon, he was met in a bar by a man who told him that his name was Rithman and that he could get a letter to the girl he had known in Dar-es-Salaam. Rithman offered Scott-Ford 1,000 Portuguese escudos if he would confirm the rumour that all British ships had been ordered to be in port on 28 June. Scott-Ford undertook to try to find out and to meet again the following day. Although unable to find confirmation, Scott-Ford met with Rithman and a man who called himself Captain Henley and appeared to be Rithman's superior. Confessing to not having supplied the information wanted, the group nevertheless discussed issues such as the state of morale in Britain, public opinion of Winston Churchill, and the extent of air raid damage. Henley gave him a 1,000-escudo note and arranged another meeting a few days later.

At this meeting, Scott-Ford was driven around in a car to disorient him and then taken to a room where he was asked to obtain more information about the location of British minefields, the arrival of American servicemen in Britain, and up-to-date copies of Jane's Fighting Ships and Jane's All the World's Aircraft. Henley asked Scott-Ford to sign a receipt for the 1,000 escudos, which Scott-Ford did, using his real name. His ship sailed the next day; all the crew were interrogated on arrival at Liverpool to ask if they had been approached by German agents. Scott-Ford stated that he had been approached but had not cooperated.

Blackmail
The Finland sailed for Lisbon again in July, arriving on 26 July. Scott-Ford again met up with the Germans, receiving another 500 escudos for expenses (again signing a receipt) although he had been unable to get the books which they had requested. The Germans threatened to give the receipts to the British Embassy. Scott-Ford did give details of the convoy he had sailed in and its protection, the location of an aircraft factory, and the training of troops for an invasion of Europe. At the end of the meeting, he was told to keep a record of the movement and speed of the convoy and given another 100 escudos. Another meeting was arranged, but Scott-Ford was unable to keep it as the Finland sailed for Manchester.

Confession
On arriving at Salford Docks on 18 August, Scott-Ford was again routinely asked about approach attempts from German intelligence, and this time described a man who had asked him about communism in Britain. The authorities had already had word from Lisbon that an agent codenamed 'RUTHERFORD' by the Germans had been talking and therefore arranged to see him again the next day. Scott-Ford admitted that he had received 1,600 escudos (about £18 in 1942, or £ in ) for information. He was taken into custody and sent to the 'London Reception Centre', where refugees were routinely screened for German agents. The notes which Scott-Ford had made about the convoy were found in a search of his quarters on the Finland.

Trial and execution
In order to keep Scott-Ford in custody, an order was issued under Defence Regulation 18B for him to be detained. He was sent to Camp 020, an interrogation centre based at Latchmere House on Ham Common in southwest London where he complied with the authorities, although he became increasingly alarmed as he began to understand the seriousness of his situation. Professor A. W. B. Simpson, a historian of detention without trial, has speculated that Scott-Ford was offered his life in return for additional information on the Germans' intelligence system, but had no more to give.

Scott-Ford was charged under the Treachery Act 1940, and after an in camera trial before Mr Justice Birkett, was convicted on 16 October. The only sentence on conviction under the Treachery Act was death; it was the first occasion on which Birkett had found himself pronouncing a death sentence. Interviewed in 1959 by John Freeman on Face to Face, Birkett said that he "had always rather dreaded it, but when the actual moment came, I did it without the slightest trace of emotion".

Camp 020 were asked for their recommendation on whether Scott-Ford should be reprieved. The commandant wrote that there were no reasons for a reprieve: "Indeed, there may well be many who will agree that death by hanging is almost too good for a sailor who will encompass the death of thousands of his shipmates without qualm." Scott-Ford was hanged by Albert Pierrepoint at 9:00 am on 3 November 1942 at Wandsworth Prison.

The details of his trial had been kept secret until Scott-Ford was dead. The next day's papers reported that he had betrayed his country for £18, and died in consequence, as a warning to other Merchant Navy sailors who might have been approached.

References

Further reading
 
 
 "Lust and greed led Greenock lad to the gallows", HeraldScotland, 27 January 1999.

1921 births
1942 deaths
Military personnel from Plymouth, Devon
1942 crimes in the United Kingdom
Royal Navy personnel of World War II
20th-century executions by England and Wales
Royal Navy personnel who were court-martialled  
British Merchant Navy personnel of World War II
People detained under Defence Regulation 18B
People executed by the United Kingdom by hanging
English people of Scottish descent
People educated at the Royal Hospital School
Executed people from Devon
Executed British collaborators with Nazi Germany
English World War II spies for Germany
Royal Navy sailors
People executed for spying for Nazi Germany